Lolla Venkata Revanth Kumar Sharma (born 10 February 1990), known mononymously as L. V. Revanth,  is an Indian playback singer, known for his songs in Telugu language. He also won Rock Star, Spicy Singer on Maa TV and Superstar of the South. He has sung around 200 songs for Telugu and Kannada films. He was the winner of Indian Idol 9 and also sung "Manohari", from the film Baahubali: The Beginning, which he received IIFA Utsavam and Star Maa Music Award nominations for best male playback singer. In 2022, he is the winner of Bigg Boss Telugu 6.

Early life 
Revanth was born in Srikakulam to Seetha Subbalaxmi. His father died before he was born. He grew up in Visakhapatnam and did his schooling at Bala Bhanu Vidyalayam in Srikakulam and bachelor's degree at Dr. V S Krishna Government College in Visakhapatnam. He has an elder brother, Santosh Kumar. He and his elder brother were raised by their mother.

Career 
One of his first shows was Saptha Swaralu, which aired on ETV. After being runner-up in Super Singer 5 and Super Singer 7. He was a mentor in super singer 8. Revanth won Hindi reality singing show Indian Idol 9 aired on Sony Entertainment Television and was awarded a cash prize of Rs.25 Lakhs and a Mahindra KUV100.

In 2017, Revanth sang his first Hindi song, the title track for Sabse Bada Kalakar, in a reality show on Sony Entertainment Television.

He debuted with Jalak Diklaja, back in 2008, composed by Vandemataram Srinivas. He considers M. M. Keeravani as his mentor. In 2008, he sang his first film song, "Jhalak Dikhlaja" in Maha Yagnam, composed by Vandemataram Srinivas. He sang two songs "Telisiney Na Nuvvey" and "Oopiri Aaguthunnadey" in 2017 film, Arjun Reddy.

In 2019, he composed a title track for a Zee Telugu TV series Radhamma Kuthuru.

Awards and nominations 

|Bigg Boss 6 Telugu
|
|-
|2022
|Big Boss 6
|Reality Show
|
|
|-

Discography

Filmography

Television

References

External links

Living people
Telugu playback singers
Indian Idol participants
Musicians from Visakhapatnam
Singers from Andhra Pradesh
1990 births
People from Srikakulam
Indian Idol winners
Indian male singers
Bigg Boss (Telugu TV series) contestants